Bansilal Verma (1917–2003), better known by his pen name Chakor, was a cartoonist and illustrator from Gujarat, India.

Life
Bansilal Verma was born on 23 November 1917 at Chotiya village near Taranga (now in Mehsana district, Gujarat) to Jamnagauri & Gulabrai. His family belonged to Vadnagar from where he matriculated. He was inspired by Raja Ravi Verma and used to draw paintings of gods &  goddesses. During his teen years, he moved to Ahmedabad from Vadnagar and joined artist Ravishankar Raval to learn the art in 1935. In 1936, he served as an artist for three months in Lucknow session of Indian National Congress. He also met Nandalal Bose. In 1937, he joined Navsaurashtra, edited by Kakalbhai Kothari, as a cartoonist. He also contributed in Indian Independence Movement by drawing posters, banners and cartoons. He also drew cartoons for Prajabandhu weekly; Gati and Rekha magazines edited by Jayanti Dalal.

In 1948, he went to Bombay and joined Hindustan daily. After death of Sardar Patel, Hindustan stopped. He worked with Janmabhoomi from 1955 to 1959. In 1959, he joined English daily The Free Press Journal and his cartoon as also published in their Gujarati daily Janshakti. His cartoons on politics and politician were influential. Due to political pressure, he left job in 1972. In 1978, he came to Ahmedabad and joined Sandesh where he worked for years. He had illustrated several books and magazines.

He died on 8 August 2003.

Works
He drew under pen names Chakor, Bansi and Kishor Vakil. His illustration of Indian lady welcoming with folded hand is very popular.

His books of cartoons and caricatures are also published. His large number of cartoons are published in newspapers and magazines. He had also painted domes of some Jain temples, 25 paintings, large number of illustrations and covers for books. Vamanmathi Virat is his notable collection of  cartoons on Lal Bahadur Shastri. He also illustrated two colouring books published by Khadi and Gramodyog. He has published children's comic books; Hanuman, Shiv-Parvati, Karna, Vikram Ane Vetal and Veer Balko. Some of his paintings are stored in Mysore Art Gallery. His humour articles are collected in Vinod Vatika. He has written essays such as Bharatma Angreji Amal and Shantimay Kranti.

Recognition
He won a prize at Third International Salon of Cartoons in Montreal, Canada for a cartoon titled If Dragon Comes To UN, published in The Free Press Journal. He had also received Sanskar Award, Surat Lions Shield, Kamalashankar Pandya Award and Vadnagar Nagrik Sanman. He received Ravishankar Raval Award instituted by Government of Gujarat. A square near Vasna-Pirana bridge in Ahmedabad is named after him.

References

1917 births
2003 deaths
Indian cartoonists
Writers from Gujarat
Indian editorial cartoonists
Artists from Gujarat
20th-century Indian painters
People from Mehsana district
Painters from Gujarat